The surname Voegelin or Vögelin may refer to:

Charles F. Voegelin (1906–1986), American linguist and anthropologist, husband to Erminie and Florence
Eric Voegelin (1901–1985), American philosopher
Erminie Wheeler-Voegelin (1903-1988), American anthropologist, first wife of Charles F. Voegelin
Ernst Vögelin (1529–1589), German book printer
Florence M. Voegelin (1927–1989), American anthropologist, second wife of Charles F. Voegelin